This is a complete list of episodes for the ABC television  drama series The Fugitive. The first episode aired on September 17, 1963 and the series finale aired with a two-part episode entitled "The Judgment" on August 22 and August 29, 1967 – purposefully held back to build suspense, aired just before the start of the next television season. The series ran for four seasons with 30 episodes each, bringing it to a total of 120, 90 in black and white (seasons 1-3) and 30 in color (season 4).

Series overview

Episodes

Season 1 (1963–64)

The first season contains a total of 30 episodes which were originally broadcast in the United States from September 17, 1963 to April 21, 1964.

Season 2 (1964–65)

The second season contains a total of 30 episodes which were originally broadcast in the United States from September 15, 1964 to April 20, 1965.

Season 3 (1965–66)

The third season contains a total of 30 episodes which were originally broadcast in the United States from September 14, 1965 to April 26, 1966.

Season 4 (1966–67)

The fourth season (filmed in color) contains a total of 30 episodes which were originally broadcast in the United States from September 13, 1966 to August 29, 1967.

References

Lists of American crime drama television series episodes
Episodes